Make My Day is a Japanese animated series produced for Netflix. It features an original story by Yasuo Ohtagaki. Makoto Honda was the director for the series, and 5 Inc. animated and provided character designs. The series was released on February 2, 2023.

Premise 
A prison has been established on a freezing cold planet where the prisoners are forced to work in a large mine.  One day mysterious creatures come up from the mine and attack the prisoners.

Voice cast

Production 
Netflix first announced the project as part of their Geeked Week in June 2021.  The story was written by Yasuo Ohtagaki, Makoto Honda directed, and animation and character designs are done by 5 Inc. At the 2022 Geeked Week, Netflix released a first look at some character screenshots, alongside their voice actors, and the design of the mecha Casper by Ohtagaki and Shoji Kawamori. Yumiko Yoshizawa wrote the script and Kensuke Ushio composed the music.

Release 
Make My Day was originally announced as an animated film, but in January 2023, Netflix announced that it would be a series instead. The series was fully released on February 2, 2023.

References

External links
 
 
 

2023 anime ONAs
Anime with original screenplays
Horror anime and manga
Japanese-language Netflix original programming
Science fiction anime and manga
Netflix original anime